Sven Olov Dennis Lyxzén (born June 19, 1972) is a Swedish singer and songwriter, best known as the lead vocalist for influential Swedish hardcore punk band Refused, as well as the bands INVSN and Fake Names. He is also a former member of bands including AC4, Step Forward, Final Exit, and The (International) Noise Conspiracy, and co-founded the Swedish record labels Ny Våg and Desperate Fight Records.

Career

Refused 

Following a stint in the short-lived hardcore band Step Forward, Lyxzén formed Refused in 1991 with drummer David Sandström, guitarist Pär Hansson, and bassist Jonas Lindgren. They released three studio albums, This Just Might Be... the Truth (1994), Songs to Fan the Flames of Discontent (1996), and The Shape of Punk to Come (1998), the latter of which was heavily influential on later bands but a commercial and critical failure upon release, and the group disbanded that same year. 

In March 2010, there were rumours that Refused would be reuniting after a 12 years hiatus, although Lyxzén dismissed the notion as he and Sandström were busy with the band AC4. However, Refused unexpectedly reunited in 2012 for the Refused Reunion Tour, including appearances at Coachella, the Way Out West Festival, the Fun Fun Fun Fest, and Groezrock in Meerhout, Belgium. While the reunion was intended to be temporary, in 2015 the band released a fourth studio album, Freedom, via Epitaph Records. Speaking on the band's future in 2017, Lyxzén said, "We’re not breaking up or anything, we’re taking a break to write a new record… But the Australian tour will be the last tour for a while… We’ll take some time off, and then we’ll start writing some songs but we’re not breaking up, no."

Other work 
Outside of Refused, Lyxzén has been involved in a number of bands, most notably The (International) Noise Conspiracy, INVSN (previously called The Lost Patrol Band), and Fake Names, the latter a supergroup formed with guitarists Brian Baker (Minor Threat, Bad Religion) and Michael Hampton (Embrace), drummer Matt Schulz (Enon), and bassist Johnny Temple (Girls Against Boys).. He also revealed in December 2021 that he had formed a new punk band with INVSN bandmate Sara Almgren, with him on rhythm guitar and Almgren on bass and vocals.

Lyxzén also runs Ny Våg, an independent punk record label he co-founded with former Refused bassist Inge Johansson, and produced the 2005 self-titled album by label signee Regulations. He also co-founded the now-defunct labels Desperate Fight Records and Umeå Hardcore Records.

In 2011, Lyxzén joined Italian electronic act The Bloody Beetroots for their "Church of Noise" tour as a guest vocalist, and was featured on the act's single of the same name.

Lyxzén provided the singing vocals for the character Johnny Silverhand (with Refused portraying the character's band Samurai) in the 2020 video game Cyberpunk 2077. He also provided vocals for the track "Silent No More" from the 2022 game Metal: Hellsinger.

Public image and personal life 
As a punk rock frontman, Lyxzén's songs are often of a counterculture nature, in line with his socialist politics, although he has explored a variety of topics in his music. 

Lyxzén was voted "Sexiest Man in Sweden" in 2004 by Elle Magazine. He is a vegan, having discovered animal rights around 1989 and adopted the lifestyle in the early 1990s.

Associated bands

Current bands
 Refused – lead vocals (1991–1998, 2012–present)
 INVSN – lead vocals, guitar (1999–present)
 Fake Names – lead vocals (2018–present)

Former bands
 AC4 – lead vocals (2008–2013)
 Instängd – drums, percussion (2008–2011)
 The (International) Noise Conspiracy – lead vocals (1998–2009)
 93 Million Miles From the Sun – lead vocals, guitar (1997–1998)
 Final Exit (credited in the band as D-Rp) – bass (1994–1997)
 By No Means – guitar (1992)
 Step Forward – lead vocals (1989–1991)
 Garbage Pailkids – bass (1989–1991)
 Afro Jetz – lead vocals, bass (1987–1989)
 Yonderboy

Selected discography

Refused 

 This Just Might Be... the Truth (1994)
 Songs to Fan the Flames of Discontent (1996)
 The Shape of Punk to Come (1998)
 Freedom (2015)
 War Music (2019)

INVSN 

As The Lost Patrol:

 Songs in the Key of Resistance (1999)
 Songs About Running Away (2003)

As The Lost Patrol Band:

 The Lost Patrol Band (2005)
 Automatic (2006)

As Invasionen:

 Hela Världen Brinner (2010) 
 Saker Som Jag Sagt Till Natten (2011)

As INVSN:

 INVSN (2013)
 The Beautiful Stories (2017)
 Let The Night Love You (2022)

AC4 

 AC4 (2009)
 Burn the World (2013)

The (International) Noise Conspiracy 

 The First Conspiracy (1999)
 Survival Sickness (2000)
 A New Morning, Changing Weather (2001)
 Armed Love (2004)
 The Cross of My Calling (2008)

Final Exit 

 Teg (1995)
 Umeå (1997)

Step Forward 

 I Am Me (1990)
 Does It Make A Difference (1990)
 It Did Make a Difference (1996)

Fake Names 

 Fake Names (2020)
 Fake Names EP (2021)
 Expendables (2023)

Instängd 

 Mitt Svar På Ingenting EP (2007)
 Konkret Och Brutal EP (2008)
 Drag Utan Drog EP (2011)

93 Million Miles 

 93 Million Miles (2003)

By No Means 

 Straight (1992)

Garbage Pailkids 

 Garbage Pailkids (1990)
 Pailkids on the Block (1991)

Other credits

See also
 Ny Våg

References

External links
 
 The Lost Patrol Band at Burning Heart
 Dennis Lyxzén – working 9 to 5!
  Interview with Susan Chung at Razorcake
 Interview with Dennis Lyxzén at wenn's rockt! WebTV
 Interview with Dennis Lyxzén from Poorboys on The Road
 Interview with Dennis Lyxzén: "Most Music Is Heartless, Soulless And Unsexy from Poorboys on The Road
 Ny Våg
 Ny Våg @ Myspace.com

1972 births
English-language singers from Sweden
Living people
People from Umeå
Refused members
Swedish punk rock musicians
Swedish rock singers
Swedish anti-capitalists
Post-hardcore musicians